Roberto García Casabella (born 9 January 1987) is a Spanish footballer who last played as a defensive midfielder for Villarrubia CF.

Career

He began his career in the Real Madrid youth team, before moving to Atlético Madrid where he played for the B and C teams.

Between 2006 and 2012, he played in the Segunda División B for Atlético Madrid B, San Fernando, Puertollano, Lorca Atlético, Almeria B (loan) and Conquense.

In the summer of 2012 he joined Moldovan National Division side Milsami Orhei, playing in the Moldovan Super Cup final win over Sheriff Tiraspol, as well as 90 minutes of the 4-2 UEFA Europa League home win over Aktobe, and the subsequent away leg 0-3 defeat that eliminated the Moldovan side 4-5 on aggregate.

In July 2013, he was on trial at Barnet in the Conference Premier, with compatriot Luisma Villa. Both players had their signings confirmed on 3 August 2013. Casabella played frequently at the start of the season, but struggled with injuries from October onwards. After 12 appearances in all competitions, all but one in the league, he was released on 14 April 2014.

After leaving the Bees, Casabella joined Thunder Bay Chill of the USL Premier Development League. In August 2014, he re-joined San Fernando.

In June 2015, Casabella signed for Armenian Premier League side FC Ararat Yerevan. Less than a month later, without playing a game for Ararat Yerevan, Casabella moved back to Spain, signing for Rayo Cantabria.

Honours
Milsami Orhei
Moldovan Super Cup: 2012

References

External links

1987 births
Living people
Spanish footballers
Footballers from the Community of Madrid
Association football midfielders
Segunda División B players
Tercera División players
National League (English football) players
USL League Two players
Atlético Madrid C players
Atlético Madrid B players
CD San Fernando players
CD Puertollano footballers
UD Almería B players
UB Conquense footballers
Atlético Sanluqueño CF players
FC Milsami Orhei players
Barnet F.C. players
Thunder Bay Chill players
San Fernando CD players
Spanish expatriate footballers
Expatriate footballers in Moldova
Expatriate footballers in England
Expatriate footballers in Armenia
Expatriate soccer players in Canada
Spanish expatriate sportspeople in England
Spanish expatriate sportspeople in Canada
Deportivo Rayo Cantabria players
Lorca Atlético CF players